False self-employment is a situation in which somebody registered as self-employed, a freelancer, or a temp is de facto an employee carrying out a professional activity under the authority and subordination of another company. Such false self-employment is often a way to circumvent social welfare and employment legislation, for example by avoiding employer's social security and income tax contributions. While a modern "gig economy" encourages more casual employment practices in the interests of labour flexibility, the extent to which this disguises precarious employment and denial of rights is of growing concern to authorities.

There is a grey area of self-employed persons who rely heavily on a single customer while legitimately being independent.

Principle 
A salaried-work relation hidden behind a false pretense of self-employment is in some jurisdictions a violation of and a non‑compliance with labour law.

For social security, the falsely self-employed is declared not to be subject to employment law, but actually works under an employer's authority in a subordinate relationship, with the same conditions as his salaried colleagues but without any employment contract.

When a salaried-work relation is hidden under such a false pretense, there is a violation of law and both parties expose themselves to sanctions.

The constitutive elements of an employment contract typically are:
 Work performed;
 for remuneration;
 in a subordinate relationship.

In Belgium 
The (Belgian) legislator considers the following elements to define a subordinate relationship:
 No worker's participation in the company's profits or losses;
 No proper capital investments in the company;
 No responsibility or decision‑taking power in the company;
 The certainty of getting a regular payment;
 The fact of having just a single and unique customer company;
 The fact of having no personal workers/the fact of not being an employer;
 The fact of not being able to organise one's working period;
 The existence of in-house control procedures, with related sanctions;
 No decision‑taking power concerning customers’ invoicing.
Labour law tends in a jurisprudential way to view self-employment as false when many of the above elements are present.

The ministers’ council (the Belgian Cabinet) on 5 May 2006 examined a legislative proposal (a bill) which no longer refers to a “faux indépendant” (read: falsely self-employed person), but to "qualification adequate de la nature des relations de travail" ("appropriate qualification about the nature of relationships at work"), whether salaried or independent. The bill came from the minister of small business, Sabine Laruelle (MR political party – liberal), and the minister of social affairs, Rudy Demotte (PS political party – socialist). The governmental declaration of July 2004 already planned such a bill.

The legislative proposal confirms the general principles stated by the jurisprudence and the Court of Cassation: to have an employment contract, there must be a relationship of authority and subordination; (and) to have a contract between independent actors, there must be no such relationship. This reflects the party's intention as expressed in their programme. Elements such as freedom to organise one's working time/period, freedom to organise one's work and the possibility to have a hierarchical control allow to evaluate the existence or not of any hierarchical relationship.

Moreover, this establishes legal certainty: the current system of freedom of contract between parties is confirmed, the potential problems are framed either in specific sectors, or in individual situations.

In Britain

Construction industry
A British trade union UCATT which specialized in the construction industry has expressed concern that false self-employment was being used by many British employers to evade taxes and engage workers without having to respect employment rights and entitlements such as holiday pay, sick pay and pensions. In their opinion, whilst the practice was immoral, it was not, in their view, necessarily illegal.
The UK taxation arrangement known as the  Construction Industry Scheme (CIS)  allowed registered companies to deduct tax at source and thus avoid employing workers directly as their regular or casual employee who would thus have acquired legal employee rights.

Instead casual staff could be assumed to be sub-contractors who were falsely supposed to be self-employed, and thus responsible for paying their own tax and social security contributions.

If such persons were not registered as self-employed, they would thereby be liable for unlawfully evading their legal obligations.

Offshore Oil
The British Government's HM Revenue and Customs service found in 2013  evidence that some companies and employment businesses connected with the offshore oil industry were using employment intermediaries to disguise the employment of their workers as self-employment, primarily to avoid paying employers National Insurance contributions  and to reduce the costs associated with workers’ employment rights.

Spain
The Spanish Ministry of Employment is trying (as of mid August 2017) to address commercial accounting agencies who invoice employers on behalf of regular employees falsely presented self-employed persons to evade or minimise their tax and social security obligations (Self employed people are known as autónomos in Spanish, and usually raise their own invoices for irregular work assignments themselves). Fidelis Factu Sociedad Cooperativa, better known as Factoo, has been obliged to close its operation following a sanction imposed by the Ministry. There are known to be several other cooperatives of this type, although Factoo is the largest so far identified and the first to be shut down.

Although the persecution of false freelancers, by the Labor Inspectorate in Spain, has intensified in recent times, there are still many entrepreneurs who encourage covering up an employment relationship with a false business relationship. It's essential to differentiate an employment relationship (employer-employee) from a business relationship (entrepreneur-self-employed). The legal definition of employed worker found in art. 1.1 of the Spanish Workers’ Statute mentions these four defining notes: willfulness, alienation, dependence and remuneration.

See also 
 For the treatment of this issue under US tax law, see Misclassification of employees as independent contractors
Umbrella company
IR35 (UK)

References 

Employment classifications
Labour law